How Rock'n'Roll was Ruined is a 1989 Serbian anthology comedy film.  It consists of three stories, written and directed by three different screenwriters and directors.  The score was also a joint effort, with lead musicians from rock bands Idoli, Električni Orgazam, and Disciplina Kičme each composing the music for one segment. The three independent stories are situated within the context of popular and youth culture in Yugoslavia at the time just before the country broke up, and abound with satirical, farcical, and absurdist humour.  The film was awarded a Golden Arena for Best Film Editing at the Pula Film Festival in 1989.  It attained cult status in the following years.

Soundtrack 

The soundtrack for the film came out in 1989. The music for each story segment was written by a different musician, with intro, outro, and intermezzos composed and acted by Dušan Kojić as his stage persona Zeleni zub (Green Tooth).

See also 
List of Yugoslavian films
Popular music in the Socialist Federal Republic of Yugoslavia
Rock and roll and the fall of communism

References

External links 

1989 films
Serbo-Croatian-language films
Yugoslav comedy films
Serbian comedy films
Films set in Yugoslavia
Films set in Serbia
Cultural depictions of Serbian women
Cultural depictions of Serbian men